The first USS Roamer (SP-1047) was a United States Navy patrol vessel in commission from 1917 to 1919.

Roamer was built as a civilian steam launch of the same name in 1902 by Herreshoff Manufacturing Company at Bristol, Rhode Island. On 29 June 1917, the U.S. Navy acquired her from the State of Florida at Tallahassee, Florida, for use as a section patrol boat during World War I. She was commissioned on 20 July 1917 as USS Roamer (SP-1047).

Assigned to the 8th Naval District, Roamer carried out patrol duties for the rest of World War I.

Roamer was decommissioned on 28 January 1919. She was stricken from the Navy List on 17 June 1919 and sold to Frank A. Egan of New Rochelle, New York, on 19 July 1919.

References

SP-1047 Roamer at Department of the Navy Naval History and Heritage Command Online Library of Selected Images: U.S. Navy Ships -- Listed by Hull Number "SP" #s and "ID" #s -- World War I Era Patrol Vessels and other Acquired Ships and Craft numbered from SP-1000 through SP-1099
NavSource Online: Section Patrol Craft Photo Archive Roamer (SP 1047)

Patrol vessels of the United States Navy
World War I patrol vessels of the United States
Ships built in Bristol, Rhode Island
1902 ships